Amselina kasyi is a moth of the family Autostichidae. It is found in North Macedonia and Greece.

References

Moths described in 1961
Moths of Europe
Amselina